Ray Danton (born Raymond Caplan; September 19, 1931 – February 11, 1992) was a radio, film, stage, and television actor, director, and producer whose most famous roles were in the screen biographies The Rise and Fall of Legs Diamond (1960) and The George Raft Story (1962). He was married to actress Julie Adams from 1954 to 1981.

Life and career

Early life
Danton was born Raymond Caplan in New York City, the son of Myrtle (née Menkin) and Jack Caplan. His family was Jewish, and he was a descendant of the Vilna Gaon.

Danton entered show business as a child radio actor on NBC radio's Let's Pretend show in 1943 at age twelve.  He began acting on radio and stage regularly also working as an assistant stage manager.

Danton attended Horace Mann School and in 1947 he started at what is now Carnegie Mellon University where he appeared in many stage productions. He went to New York to try and make it on Broadway and ended up appearing on television dramas. In 1950, he went to London to appear on stage in the Tyrone Power production Mister Roberts. He returned to guest star on shows like Danger (an episode directed by Sidney Lumet) and Starlight Theatre.

Danton's acting career was put on hold when he served in the United States Army infantry during the Korean War from 1951–1953. When he returned to the U.S., he resumed his television career, appearing in shows like Kraft Theatre, The Man Behind the Badge, Lux Video Theatre and You Are There. He played Jean Lafitte in The Pirate and the Lawyer (1955) for the Hallmark Hall of Fame. He then received an offer from Universal.

Universal
Danton made his film debut in Chief Crazy Horse (1955) playing Little Big Man.  His second film for Universal The Looters (1955) was where he met his future wife Julie Adams.

MGM borrowed him to play Susan Hayward's boyfriend in I'll Cry Tomorrow (1955), a sizeable hit.  Back at Universal he had a role in The Spoilers (1955) then played his first lead in Outside the Law (1956).

He was prolific in television work as well as film where he received the Golden Globe Award in 1956 for the new male star of the year in film.

He had the lead in The Night Runner (1957) and appeared in shows like Studio 57, Schlitz Playhouse, Playhouse 90, Studio One in Hollywood, Matinee Theatre, Climax!, and Decision.

Warner Bros.
Danton had a supporting role in Too Much, Too Soon (1958) at Warner Bros playing an abusive husband of Diana Barrymore. He signed a long term contract with the studio, appearing in Onionhead (1958).

Danton starred in Tarawa Beachhead (1958) at Columbia, with co-star Kerwin Mathews, and his off-screen wife Julie Adams. That year, Danton guest-starred in Yancy Derringer and shows 77 Sunset Strip.

He returned to MGM to star in two films for Albert Zugsmith: The Beat Generation and The Big Operator.

Warners gave him supporting roles in Yellowstone Kelly and Ice Palace and gave him the lead in a TV series The Alaskans (1959-1960).

The studio then cast him in his most famous role The Rise and Fall of Legs Diamond (1960) where he played the eponymous gangster for director Budd Boetticher.

He appeared in the drama series Bourbon Street Beat, Hawaiian Eye, Cheyenne, Maverick and The Roaring 20s.

In 1960, Danton and Ron Foster were cast as Kane and Tommy Potts, respectively, in the episode "Bounty List" of the western series Colt .45. He also appeared in the ABC/WB western Lawman. Response was so strong Warners announced they would give Danton his own show, Las Vegas.

Instead, he did A Fever in the Blood (1961) and reprised the role of Legs Diamond in Vic Morrow's Portrait of a Mobster.

Danton maintained his gangster persona with the title role in The George Raft Story, a screen biography of 1930s actor/dancer George Raft. "I guess I'm the last of the big time gangsters," he said in a 1962 interview.

In 1961, Danton co-starred with Rosalind Russell, Alec Guinness, and Madlyn Rhue in A Majority of One. He was one of many stars in The Longest Day (1962) and had a supporting role in The Chapman Report (1962).

On October 9, 1962, Danton appeared as the gunfighter Vince Jackson in the episode "The Fortune Hunter" of Laramie. He also guest-starred in the NBC western Empire and its successor series Redigo, both starring Richard Egan. November 7, 1962 he took on the role of Lt. Steve Hamilton, one of Col. Teddy Roosevelt's "Rough Riders"(It's 1898 and The Spanish American War)in an episode entitled "Riff-Raff" on the first season of "The Virginian."

Danton was in the TV movie FBI Code 98 (1963).

In 1964, Danton was cast in the episode "The Wooing of Perilous Pauline" of Death Valley Days. He returned to the stage to perform in 110 in the Shade.

Europe
Danton went to Europe to star in Sandokan to the Rescue (1964) which was popular enough for a sequel Return of Sandokan (1964). He stayed in Europe to make Code Name: Jaguar (1965).

He returned to the USA to guest star in Honey West and The Man from UNCLE then went back to Europe to make Secret Agent Super Dragon (1966), How to Win a Billion... and Get Away with It (1967), Si muore solo una volta (1967), Lucky, el intrépido (1967), Hello Glen Ward, House Dick (1968), and Die grosse Treibjagd (1969).

He would periodically return to the US to guest star on shows like Ironside, ‘’Hawaii Five-0’’, It Takes a Thief, and Dan August.

Producer and director
He formed a production company in Europe producing films like The Last Mercenary and began directing with Deathmaster (1972) and Psychic Killer (1975).  Danton continued directing as well as acting and started producing films such as Triangle in 1971.

He was in The Ballad of Billie Blue (1972), A Very Missing Person (1972), Runaway! (1973), The Centerfold Girls (1974), and Apache Blood (1975).

Return to the U.S.
He guest-starred in an episode of Nakia and a Hawaii Five-O episode "Steal 
Now, Pay Later".

He began a busy directing career in television, helming episodes of Switch, Baretta, Cagney & Lacey, Fame, T.J. Hooker and Mickey Spillane's Mike Hammer. "Acting has fallen to an all-time low in this country," he said in a 1985 interview.

He directed a stage production of Come Back, Little Sheba in 1987.

Danton directed many episodes of Magnum PI in Season 8, 1987-1988.

Personal life
Danton was married to actress Julie Adams from 1954 or 1955 until their divorce in 1981. They had two sons: assistant director Steven Danton (b. 1956) and editor Mitchell Danton (b. 1962).

Death
Danton died of kidney failure in Los Angeles, California.

Filmography

Chief Crazy Horse (1955) as Little Big Man
The Looters (1955) as Pete Corder
The Spoilers (1955) as Blackie
I'll Cry Tomorrow (1955) as David Tredman
Outside the Law (1956) as John Conrad, alias Johnny Salvo
Somebody Up There Likes Me (1956) as Off-Screen Reporter (voice, uncredited)
The Night Runner (1957) as Roy Turner
Trackdown (1957 TV Series) episode "Sweetwater Texas" as Clem Reese
Too Much, Too Soon (1958) as John Howard
Onionhead (1958) as Ensign Dennis Higgins
Yancy Derringer (1958 TV series) episode "An Ace Called Spade" as Spade StuartTarawa Beachhead (1958) as Lt. Joel BradyThe Beat Generation (1959) as Stan HessThe Big Operator (1959) as Oscar 'The Executioner' WetzelYellowstone Kelly (1959) - Sayapi, Gall's NephewIce Palace (1960) as Bay HusackThe Rise and Fall of Legs Diamond (1960) as Jack 'Legs' DiamondCheyenne season 5, episode 5: "Savage Breed" (1960) as Marshal Al LestradeMaverick season 4, episode 16: "A State Of Siege" (1961) as Don Felipe ArchuletaA Fever in the Blood (1961) as Attorney Clem MarkerPortrait of a Mobster (1961) as 'Legs' DiamondThe George Raft Story (1961) as George RaftA Majority of One (1961) as Jerry BlackThe Longest Day (1962) as Capt. FrankLaramie (1962 TV series) as Vince Jackson, a very suave conman/gunslingerThe Virginian (1962 TV series) episode "Riff Raff" as Lt. Steve Hamilton, an officer serving under Col. Teddy Roosevelt in the Spanish American War
The Chapman Report (1962) as Fred Linden
FBI Code 98 (1963) as Fred Vitale
 Sandokan to the Rescue (1964) as Sandokan
 Sandokan Against the Leopard of Sarawak (1964) as Sandokan
Code Name: Jaguar (1965) as Jeff Larson
Secret Agent Super Dragon (1966) as Bryan Cooper / Super Dragon
Ballata da un miliardo (1967) as Big Joe Martin
 (1967) as Mike Gold
Lucky, the Inscrutable (1967) as Lucky
Llaman de Jamaica, Mr. Ward (1968) as Glen Ward
The Last Mercenary (1968) as Mark / Marco Anderson
Triangle (1970) as Carlo Di Fermi
 (1971) as Jimmy Logan
The Ballad of Billie Blue (1972)
The Runaway Train (1973) as Prof. Jack Dunn
Blood, Black and White (1973)
Centerfold Girls (1974) as Perry
Apache Blood (1975) as Yellow Shirt
The Rockford Files - TV Series (1975) as Chester Sierra (Episode: Chicken Little is a Little Chicken)
Psychic Killer (1975) as Narrator (voice, uncredited)
Sixpack Annie (1975) as Mr. O'Meyer
Our Man Flint: Dead on Target (1976) as Derek Flint

References

External links

Ray Danton in Secret Agent Super Dragon (TCM Movie Morlocks)

1931 births
1992 deaths
20th-century American male actors
American expatriates in Italy
American male film actors
American film directors
American male radio actors
American male stage actors
American male television actors
American television directors
Television producers from California
United States Army personnel of the Korean War
Jewish American male actors
Male actors from Los Angeles
Deaths from kidney failure
Warner Bros. contract players
20th-century American businesspeople
Western (genre) television actors
New Star of the Year (Actor) Golden Globe winners
20th-century American Jews